The Phycological Society of America (PSA) is a professional society, founded in 1946, that is dedicated to the advancement of phycology, the study of algae.  The PSA is responsible for the publication of Journal of Phycology and organizes annual conferences among other events that aid in the advancement of related algal sciences.

Membership in the Phycological Society of America is open to anyone from any nation who is concerned with the physiology, taxonomy, molecular biology, experimental biology, cell biology, and developmental biology of related algal sciences.  As of 2012, membership was approximately 2,000 from 63 countries.

Awards and Fellowships

The PSA offers four honorary awards that are announced at the annual conference

 The Harold C. Bold Award, established in 1973, the Bold Award is given for the outstanding graduate student paper(s) presented at the Annual Meeting as determined by the Bold Award Committee.
 The Gerald W. Prescott Award, The Prescott Award is given to recognize scholarly work in English in the form of a published book or monograph devoted to phycology published in the last 2 years.
 The Luigi Provasoli Award, The Luigi Provasoli Award is presented annually to the author(s) of the three, or fewer, outstanding papers published in the Journal of Phycology during the previous fiscal year.
 The Ralph A. Lewin Poster Award, The Lewin Award is presented to graduate student members of the PSA for the creation and presentation of an original research poster. 
 The L. H. Tiffany Award, The L. H. Tiffany Award is presented to an individual or team who enhances the awareness or importance of algae through an original work within the previous 3 years. 
 The Award of Excellence, This award has been established to recognize phycologists who have demonstrated sustained scholarly contributions in and impact on the field of phycology over their careers. These individuals have also provided service to PSA as well as other phycological societies.

The PSA also offers grants and fellowships to assist funding for algal research.

Meetings

The PSA organizes an annual Phycological meeting each year:
 PSA 2012: Charleston, SC
 PSA 2011: Seattle, WA (joint meeting with the International Society of Protistologists)
 PSA 2010: East Lansing, MI
 PSA 2009: Honolulu, HI (joint meeting with the American Society of Plant Biologists)
 PSA 2008: New Orleans, LA
 PSA 2007: Providence, RI
 PSA 2006: Jeannau, AK (joint meeting with the Northwest Algal Symposium)
 [PSA 2005]: Durban, KwaZulu-Natal, South Africa (joint meeting with the International Phycological Congress)
 PSA 2004: Williamsburg, VA
 PSA 2003: Glenden Beach, OR (joint meeting with the Northwest Algal Symposium and the International Society of Protistologists)
 [PSA 2002]: Madison, WI (joint meeting with the Botanical Society of America)
 PSA 2001: Estes Par, CO
 [PSA 2000]: San Diego, CA (joint meeting with the American Society of Plant Physiologists)

References

External links
 Official website

Botanical societies
Professional associations based in the United States
Organizations established in 1946
Natural Science Collections Alliance members
1946 establishments in the United States
Phycology
Scientific societies based in the United States